Walter Gould Hargesheimer (August 10, 1912 – May 18, 1996) was an American football player and coach of football and basketball.  He served as the head football coach at Sioux Falls College, now the University of Sioux Falls, from 1935 to 1936 and at Massachusetts State College, now the University of Massachusetts Amherst, from 1941 to 1942 and again in 1946.

Hargesheimer played football at the University of Minnesota, from which he graduated in 1934, as a back for the Golden Gophers in 1932 and 1933.  After coaching football at Sioux Falls College in 1935 and 1936, he was the backfield coach and varsity basketball coach at Oberlin College from 1937 to 1940.  He then coached football, basketball, and track at Highland Park High School in Highland Park, Illinois, before taking the appointment of head football coach and Professor of Physical Education at Massachusetts State College in January 1941.

Head coaching record

College football

College basketball

Notes

References

External links
 Walter Hargesheimer at College Basketball at Sports-Reference.com
 

1912 births
1996 deaths
Minnesota Golden Gophers football players
Oberlin Yeomen basketball coaches
Oberlin Yeomen football coaches
Oklahoma Sooners football coaches
Sioux Falls Cougars football coaches
Sioux Falls Cougars men's basketball coaches
UMass Minutemen basketball coaches
UMass Minutemen football coaches
USC Trojans football coaches
University of Massachusetts Amherst faculty
College men's basketball head coaches in the United States
High school football coaches in Illinois
High school basketball coaches in Illinois
Basketball coaches from Minnesota
People from Olmsted County, Minnesota
Players of American football from Minnesota